Esso Maracaibo was a tanker of the Creole Petroleum Corporation (a subsidiary of Standard Oil Corporation of New Jersey). She was the second ship of that enterprise to bear that name, the first one having been . Its purpose was to transport crude oil between Lake Maracaibo and Aruba. It made international headlines on 6 April 1964, when it rammed the General Rafael Urdaneta Bridge, causing two spans of it to collapse.

Construction
Esso Maracaibo was one of four tankers built in 1959 for the Creole Petroleum Corporation at shipyards in Japan. Like her sister Esso Caracas (yard no. 3825), she was built at the Hitachi Zosen shipyard in Innoshima where she was launched on 23 February 1959. Two other ships of the same class, Esso Amuay and Esso Caripito, were built by Mitsui Shipbuilding & Engineering. At , with 30 tanks, built along classic lines with bulbous bow, bridge and officer's quarters located amidships, and engines, crew quarters and aft deckhouse located toward the stern, those oil tankers were typical in both size and design for their time. They were equipped with modern navigational devices, radar and sonar, and air conditioning for the crew quarters. While at $7,000,000 each, those ships were a substantial investment, they made up for that by being able to transport about three times as much crude oil per voyage as the biggest lake tanker of the company so far.

Service
Following outfitting, Esso Maracaibo entered service in July 1959, to run the route between the ports of Maracaibo and San Nicolaas. She arrived at Maracaibo on 18 August 1959 after a maiden voyage of 24 days, and then delivered  of crude to the Lago refinery at Aruba on 21 August 1959. In later years, the four big tankers of the Creole Petroleum Corporation moved  of crude and other oil products to refineries on Aruba in a year.

Collision with the General Rafael Urdaneta Bridge 
On 6 April 1964 Esso Maracaibo, carrying  of crude oil, was on her way through the outlet of Lake Maracaibo when she lost her steering because of an electrical malfunction. Unable to navigate, the ship first hit pier 31 of the General Rafael Urdaneta Bridge and then also crushed pier 32. Four cars fell to the sea, resulting in seven deaths. Parts of the bridge came down on the bow of the tanker, short of the superstructure, and oil leaked out, but the ship stayed afloat. Nobody of the 42 crew members was injured.

Repairs and further service
She continued to transport crude for the Creole Petroleum Corporation, with a break in 1973, when she was in drydock and Greek tanker Dorias (94,000 DWT) substituted for her. In 1976, after Venezuela had nationalized the Venezuelan branch of the company, she was renamed Lagoven Maracaibo, but otherwise kept her service routine. In 1985, she was  decommissioned, together with Dorias towed to Taiwan, and scrapped there.

Notes

References

External links
 The images of the tragic accident of the Morandi bridge in Maracaibo in 1964

Oil tankers
Ships built by Hitachi Zosen Corporation
1959 ships
Merchant ships of Venezuela
Maritime incidents in 1964